Group B of the 2008 Fed Cup Europe/Africa Zone Group I was one of four pools in the Europe/Africa Zone Group I of the 2008 Fed Cup. Four teams competed in a round robin competition, with the top team and the bottom team proceeding to their respective sections of the play-offs: the top team played for advancement to the World Group II Play-offs, while the bottom team faced potential relegation to Group II.

Switzerland vs. Great Britain

Denmark vs. Hungary

Switzerland vs. Denmark

Great Britain vs. Hungary

Switzerland vs. Hungary

Great Britain vs. Denmark

See also
Fed Cup structure

References

External links
 Fed Cup website

2008 Fed Cup Europe/Africa Zone